Maksim Stjopin (born 8 April 2003) is a Finnish footballer who plays as a forward for HJK, on loan from Danish club FC Nordsjælland.

Career
On 3 February 2020 it was confirmed by Ilves, that Stjopin had been sold to Danish Superliga club FC Nordsjælland. However, Stjopin was registered for the clubs U-19 squad. On transfer deadline day, 31 January 2023, Stjopin joined HJK on a loan deal for the rest of 2023.

Career statistics

Club

Notes

References

2003 births
Living people
Finnish footballers
Finnish expatriate footballers
Finland youth international footballers
Association football forwards
FC Ilves players
FC Nordsjælland players
Helsingin Jalkapalloklubi players
Kakkonen players
Veikkausliiga players
Finnish expatriate sportspeople in Denmark
Expatriate men's footballers in Denmark